Bloor Street United Church is a United Church of Canada church in Toronto, Ontario, Canada. It is located on Bloor Street West in the downtown core near the intersection with Huron Street. It is just north of the University of Toronto, and between the Spadina and St. George subway stations.

As with many of the downtown Toronto churches, Bloor United is noted for its progressivism. Three Bloor Street ministers have become Moderator of the United Church of Canada – George C. Pidgeon, Ernest M. Howse, and Bruce McLeod. Robert Baird McClure was also Moderator 1968–1971 and a member of this congregation though a layman and not its minister. The Affirming congregation is led by Rev. Dr. Russ Daye, with Rev. Dr. Martha ter Kuile as part-time minister and minister of pastoral care. The church has a large choir and a strong music program led by David Passmore. The congregation has a strong commitment to helping refugees, and has a program devoted to helping Latin American refugees become permanent members of Canadian society. In addition, there are groups dedicated to helping grandmothers caring for AIDS orphans in Africa.

The children's program includes Sunday school classes for ages 4–18, and a youth and young adult discussion group. There are also online book clubs, Sunday school, free English classes, and chair yoga. Due to COVID-19, the congregation is offering worship services and events on Zoom as well as in-person. The Bloor Street building is currently undergoing redevelopment so for the time being the congregation is worshiping with St. Matthew's United Church at 729 St. Clair Avenue West.

History
The church began as a Presbyterian congregation in 1887 to serve the rapidly growing population of then-northern Toronto, with the church building opening in 1890. In 1924, the church voted by a substantial majority to join the United Church. Three years later, a portion of the church was demolished when the city decided to widen Bloor Street.

The church grew greatly in size in the 1940s and 1950s as an influx of immigrants arrived in the area. The congregation was so large that on several occasions, Massey Hall was rented to hold some services. It was decided to renovate the church, however, in 1954 as these were nearing completion a fire broke out and the church was badly damaged and most of the sanctuary destroyed. Money was quickly raised to rebuild the church and in the interim the congregation met at nearby churches and Convocation Hall.

See also
List of United Church of Canada churches in Toronto

References

"Bloor Street church earns heritage honour; council notes." The Villager. Oct 21, 2005. pg. ANP.01
"Bless gay couples, United Church urged." Michael McAteer Toronto Star. Mar 3, 1992. pg. A.1

External links

 
 Mystery Worshipper Report at the Ship of Fools website

United Church of Canada churches in Toronto
Gothic Revival architecture in Toronto
Churches completed in 1890
19th-century United Church of Canada church buildings
Gothic Revival church buildings in Canada